John Brackstone (born 9 February 1985) is an English former footballer who played as a left back. He played in the Football League for Hartlepool United and Darlington, and in non-league football for clubs including Gateshead, Blyth Spartans, Bedlington Terriers, Shildon
and West Auckland Town.

Playing career
Brackstone began his career in Hartlepool United's youth development programme. He moved on to the reserves, but his progress was temporarily halted when he broke his leg during the 2002–03 season.

By October 2003, he had recovered well enough for manager Neale Cooper to give him a first-team debut, as a half-time substitute away to Blackpool in the Second Division. Cooper said afterwards that Brackstone was one of only two players to "come out of [the 4–0 defeat] with any credit", and his performance earned him a first start three days later against Chesterfield. On his fifth appearance, against Whitby Town in the FA Cup, he scored his first senior goal from a free kick, but the run of games was ended by a groin problem, followed by a bout of pleurisy, and he played just twice more that season. In March 2004, he signed his first professional contract. He was a member of the Hartlepool United youth squad that took part in the 2004 Dallas Cup, and converted a penalty to open the scoring in the under-19 final, in which they beat New York/New Jersey MetroStars U19 4–1.

Described by his club profile as "an aggressive and tough-tackling defender, [who] also possesses a lot of skill and [whose] sweet left-foot means he is a threat from set-pieces", Brackstone came into the side for a run of six games in February and March 2005, but his season was ended prematurely by an attack of glandular fever. He played little in the 2005–06 season as the team were relegated to League Two. He signed a contract extension and, under the management of Danny Wilson, began the 2006–07 season as starting left back. In mid-November, he underwent surgery on a double hernia; he regained fitness but not his place in the team, and was released at the end of the season.

Brackstone moved on to League Two club Darlington, where manager, Dave Penney saw him as competition for established left back Tim Ryan. He played little: apart from four games in November between Ryan's hamstring injury and the arrival of loanee Lee Ridley he made just two appearances, and was released at the end of the season.

Brackstone signed for Conference North club Gateshead, but failed to establish himself in the side, was transfer-listed in November, and transferred to local rivals Blyth Spartans in February 2009 for a £3,000 fee. By the end of the 2009–10 season, he had made 50 appearances, mostly in the starting eleven. He then moved into Northern League football, first with Bedlington Terriers, where he spent two years before joining Shildon. In November 2015, he joined West Auckland Town on a short-term loan.

Personal life
Brackstone was born in 1985 in Hartlepool, County Durham, where he attended Henry Smith School. His older brother, Stephen, also went on to play professional football. Brackstone grew up as a Hartlepool United supporter.

While playing football part-time, Brackstone spent time as a coach with a Teesside- and County Durham-based group of children's coaching academies.

In October 2019, Brackstone played alongside his former Hartlepool team mates in a Legends v Fan Match. The 2004–05 side he played in is seen as one of the club's greatest sides. The Legends won 19-0 and Brackstone managed to get on the scoresheet.

Career statistics

Honours

Club
Hartlepool United
Dallas Cup U19: 2004
Football League Two runners-up: 2006–07

References

External links

1985 births
Living people
Footballers from Hartlepool
English footballers
Association football fullbacks
Hartlepool United F.C. players
Darlington F.C. players
Gateshead F.C. players
Blyth Spartans A.F.C. players
Bedlington Terriers F.C. players
Shildon A.F.C. players
West Auckland Town F.C. players
English Football League players
National League (English football) players
Northern Football League players